Angie Abdalla is an Egyptian actress and model. She crowned Miss Egypt in 1999.

Abdalla moved to acting and presentation. She participated in a number of Egyptian films and TV Series.

She is married to Alper Bosuter, a Turkish Chargé d'affaires in Cairo.

References

Miss Egypt winners
Miss Universe 1999 contestants
Egyptian film actresses
Egyptian television actresses
Living people
1980 births
Egyptian actresses